Eluvaitivu (Eluvaḍūva) is an island off the coast of Jaffna peninsula in northern Sri Lanka, located approximately  west of the city of Jaffna. Eluvaitivu has several meanings in Tamil including "the island of landmark" which is derived from the Tamil words elu (mast or tower), vai (land) and tivu (island).

Eluvaitivu has no causeway connecting it to the mainland or other islands but is served by a ferry service from Kayts on the neighbouring island of Velanaitivu.

References

External links

Islands of Jaffna District
Island North DS Division